Failure Of The Grand Design is the debut album from London-based band The Resonance Association, and was released via Burning Shed in October 2007. Described as "the best and most intense album released in 2007" by music website Cool Noise (where it was also named as "album of the year"); progressive site DPRP concluded that the band had "a unique sound devoid, for the most part, of any similarity to other bands" in its favourable review.

In 2010, Failure Of The Grand Design was re-released digitally with 5 bonus tracks.

Track listing

Personnel
The Resonance Association
Daniel Vincent - acoustic, electric and bass guitars, synthesisers, piano, programming, sound manipulation.
Dominic Hemy - electric and bass guitars, theremin, synthesisers, field recordings.

Additional personnel
Daniel Vincent and Dominic Hemy - production, mixing.
Christopher Hemy - mastering.
Lisa Vincent - photography
Carl Glover - graphic design

References

2007 debut albums
The Resonance Association albums
Burning Shed albums